Koro Department is a department of Bafing Region in Woroba District, Ivory Coast. In 2021, its population was  76,345 and its seat is the settlement of Koro. The sub-prefectures of the department are Booko, Borotou, Koro, Mahandougou, and Niokosso.

History
Koro Department was created in 2008 as a second-level subdivision via a split-off from Touba Department. At its creation, it was part of Bafing Region.

In 2011, districts were introduced as new first-level subdivisions of Ivory Coast. At the same time, regions were reorganised and became second-level subdivisions and all departments were converted into third-level subdivisions. At this time, Koro Department remained part of the retained Bafing Region in the new Woroba District.

Notes

Departments of Bafing Region
2008 establishments in Ivory Coast
States and territories established in 2008